FC Viktoria Plzeň is a Czech association football club from Plzeň. The club has participated in five seasons of UEFA club competitions, including two seasons in the UEFA Champions League, three seasons in the UEFA Cup and UEFA Europa League and one season in the UEFA Cup Winners' Cup. The club has played 42 UEFA matches, resulting in 24 wins, 6 draws and 12 defeats. The club's first appearance was in the 1971–72 European Cup Winners' Cup. The club's best performance is reaching the round of 16 of the Europa League, which they managed in the 2012–13 season; they later repeated the performance in the 2013–14 and 2017–18 seasons.

The club plays its home matches at Stadion města Plzně, an all-seater stadium in Plzeň. During the 2011–12 season, the club played European matches at Eden Arena in Prague due to the reconstruction of Plzeň's stadium during the play-off round and group stage of the Champions League.

Key

 S = Seasons
 P = Played
 W = Games won
 D = Games drawn
 L = Games lost
 F = Goals for
 A = Goals against
 aet = Match determined after extra time
 ag = Match determined by away goals rule

 QF = Quarter-finals
 Group = Group stage
 Group 2 = Second group stage
 PO = Play-off round
 R3 = Round 3
 R2 = Round 2
 R1 = Round 1
 Q3 = Third qualification round
 Q2 = Second qualification round
 Q1 = First qualification round
 Q = Qualification round

All-time statistics
The statistics include qualification matches and is up to date as of 15 March 2018.

The following is a list of the all-time statistics from Viktoria Plzeň's matches in the three UEFA tournaments it has participated in, as well as the overall total. The list contains the tournament, the number of seasons (S), games played (P), won (W), drawn (D) and lost (L), as well as goals for (GF), goals against (GA) and goal difference (GD).

Matches 
The following is a complete list of matches played by Viktoria Plzeň in UEFA tournaments. It includes the season, tournament, the stage, the opponent club and its country, the date, the venue and the score, with Viktoria Plzeň's score noted first. It is up to date as of 26 October 2022.

References

Europe
Plzen